William Rodman may refer to:
 William Rodman (Pennsylvania politician), U.S. Representative from Pennsylvania
 William B. Rodman, American lawyer and politician from North Carolina
 William B. Rodman Jr., his son, North Carolina lawyer and politician
 William M. Rodman, mayor of Providence, Rhode Island